François Weigel (born 1964, Trier, West Germany) is a French pianist, conductor and composer.

Biography
Weigel began piano studies at age four.  At age 12, he played organ and conducted a choir which performed his own works.  In 1979, he entered the Hochschule für Musik und Tanz Köln, where his teachers included Günther Ludwig, and studied composition there.  He subsequently studied piano, harmony, counterpoint, analysis, and chamber music at the Conservatoire National Supérieur de Musique de Paris, where his teachers included Yvonne Loriod (piano), Jean-Sébastien Béreau (orchestra conducting), Bruno Pasquier, Jean-Claude Bernède, Alain Bernaud, Roger Boutry (harmony), Alain Weber (composition). He had afterwards advanced studies in conducting at the University of Music and Performing Arts Vienna, and at the École Normale de Musique de Paris. He has also studied with Alexis Weissenberg.

Weigel has had long-standing artistic collaborations with the Flâneries musicales de Reims, and with the Paris Bastille Opera as chorus master.  He performed with Ruggero Raimondi for the program Le Grand Tour, which led to a series of recitals with Raimondi.

In other media, Weigel began a collaboration in 2010 with the journalist and writer Alain Duault for concerts in the French operas presenting the movies On the steps of the great composers, and Musical Promenades in European Music Cities. He appears regularly on radio and television programmes across Europe, such as Le Fou du roi with Stéphane Bern, Carrefour de Lodéon with Frédéric Lodéon on France Inter, Fauteuils d'Orchestre with Anne Sinclair, Le Grand Tour with Patrick de Carolis on France Télévisions, and Le monde est à vous with Jacques Martin on Antenne 2.

Awards
 1984: First Prize of the Conservatoire national supérieur de musique et de danse de Paris (CNSM) in chamber music
 1985: First Prize of the Conservatoire national supérieur de musique et de danse de Paris (CNSM) in piano
 1992: Yehudi Menuhin Foundation Prize Winner
 2002: Midem Classical Music Award
 2006: French Ordre des Palmes académiques

Recordings
Turangalîla-Symphonie by Olivier Messiaen (8.554478-79)
Classical Heat (8.520102)
 Swann in Love, 1984 film by Volker Schlöndorff

References

External links

 
 Biography on AllMusic website
 L'Association des Anciens Elèves et Elèves des CNSMD, French-language page on François Weigel 
 Profile, Naxos Records

Conservatoire de Paris alumni
École Normale de Musique de Paris alumni
21st-century French male classical pianists
20th-century French male classical pianists
French classical composers
French male classical composers
French male conductors (music)
1964 births
Living people
People from Trier
20th-century classical composers
20th-century French conductors (music)
21st-century classical composers
21st-century French conductors (music)
21st-century French composers
20th-century French composers